Pablo Trejo Pérez (born 24 January 1964) is a Mexican politician affiliated with the Party of the Democratic Revolution. As of 2014 he served as Deputy of the LX Legislature of the Mexican Congress representing the Federal District.

References

1964 births
Living people
Politicians from Mexico City
Members of the Chamber of Deputies (Mexico)
Party of the Democratic Revolution politicians
21st-century Mexican politicians